Primero de Enero is a municipality and town in the Ciego de Ávila Province, Cuba. Originally named Violeta, its name means "1st of January" in Spanish, and is referred to the final day (in 1959) of Cuban Revolution.

Geography
Located in the eastern side of its province, it borders with the municipalities of Esmeralda, Céspedes (both in Camagüey Province), Baraguá, Ciro Redondo, Morón (30 km far) and Bolivia. The town is 57 km far from Ciego de Ávila, 73 from Florida, and 112 from Camagüey. The municipal territory includes the villages as Corea, El Canario, La Victoria, Pablo, Pedro Ballester, San Martín and Velasco.

Demographics
In 2004, the municipality of Primero de Enero had a population of 27,813.

See also
Primero de Enero Municipal Museum
Municipalities of Cuba
List of cities in Cuba

References

External links

Populated places in Ciego de Ávila Province